Basement 414 or 'B414' was a venue for various forms of artistic expression located in Lansing, Michigan.  The venue hosted a variety of art exhibitions of any medium including paintings, musical acts, video and performance art, and other crafts including things such as napkin art.
Artists such as Andrew W.K., Dead Prez and the Peppermint Creek Theatre Company, among others, have performed there.

Some well known 'Basement Bands' are Straight From the Fridge, Jason Spangler, Edible Intention, and Ouch! Me Arse. B414 is also where the band A Fatal Masquerade started playing before changing their name to This Day Means Nothing.

It closed in May 2012.

References

External links
 http://b414.org

Contemporary art galleries in the United States
Music venues in Michigan
Culture of Lansing, Michigan
Art museums and galleries in Michigan